Antimo Iunco (born 6 June 1984) is an Italian footballer.

Club career

Early career
Iunco started his career at hometown club Brindisi. He followed the team to play at Serie C2 after winning the Serie D Group H champion in 2002. In January 2004, he joined Verona of Serie B in a co-ownership deal. He was made permanent in June 2004.

Chievo
After Verona relegated to Serie C1, he moved to cross town rival Chievo (in a co-ownership deal), which also relegated but from Serie A, where he won Serie A promotion in 2008. He made 19 league starts in 27 league appearances for the Serie B champion.

In June 2008, Chievo bought him outright. After the club signed Mauro Esposito on loan who had much more experience at Serie A, Iunco was out-favoured and in January 2009 loaned to Serie B struggler Salernitana after the club signed Stephen Makinwa.

Cittadella
On 30 August 2009, he joined Cittadella of Serie B, as part of the deal that Chievo signed Manuel Iori earlier, re-joining Chievo teammate Diego Oliveira. Iunco took number 7 shirt that previously owned by central midfielder Fabio Giordano.

In June 2010, Cittadella signed him in co-ownership deal for €500,000 and sold the remain 50% registration rights of Manuel Iori to Chievo.

Torino
On 12 July 2010, he was sold to fellow Serie B side Torino, and Chievo retained another 50% registration rights. (Chievo acquired Iunco outright for €700,000 and sold for €1M.) On 25 June 2011 Chievo regained all the registration rights for €99,000. It was also due to an auction error by Torino chairman Urbano Cairo, which offered €20,000 more than Chievo but did not sign it, thus it was not considered a valid offer.

Spezia
On 30 July 2011 Iunco joined Serie B club Spezia in another co-ownership deal for €150,000 fee. On 23 June 2012 Chievo bought back Iunco again, for just €750 fee.

Bari
In summer 2012 Iunco was loaned to Bari.

Trapani 
On 19 August 2013 Iunco joined Trapani. On 23 January 2015 he was transferred to Alessandria.

Alessandria & Paganese
Iunco joined Serie C club Alessandria on 23 January 2015. He spent  seasons with the club.

In summer 2016 Iunco joined another Serie C club Paganese. However, he terminated his contract in a mutual consent in the winter transfer window.

Return to Cittadella
Iunco returned to Cittadella on 10 January 2017. On 18 July he signed a new contract.

Honours
 Serie B: 2008
 Supercoppa di Lega di Prima Divisione: 2012 (Spezia)
 Lega Pro Prima Divisione: 2012 (Spezia)
 Coppa Italia Lega Pro: 2012 (Spezia)

References

External links
 Profile at La Gazzetta dello Sport (2007–08)  
 
 Profile at AIC.Football.it  
 

Italian footballers
Serie A players
Serie B players
Hellas Verona F.C. players
A.C. ChievoVerona players
U.S. Salernitana 1919 players
A.S. Cittadella players
S.S.C. Bari players
Trapani Calcio players
Association football forwards
People from Brindisi
Footballers from Apulia
1984 births
Living people
Sportspeople from the Province of Brindisi